Chungking Express is a 1994 Hong Kong romantic crime comedy-drama film written and directed by Wong Kar-wai. The film consists of two stories told in sequence, each about a lovesick Hong Kong policeman mulling over his relationship with a woman. The first story stars Takeshi Kaneshiro as a cop obsessed by his breakup with a woman named May, and his encounter with a mysterious drug smuggler (Brigitte Lin). The second stars Tony Leung as a police officer roused from his gloom over the loss of his flight attendant girlfriend (Valerie Chow) by the attentions of a quirky snack bar worker (Faye Wong).

"Chungking" in the title refers to Chungking Mansions in Tsim Sha Tsui, Hong Kong, where Wong grew up in the 1960s. "Express" refers to the food stand Midnight Express, located in Lan Kwai Fong, an area in Central, Hong Kong.

In 2022, the film appeared at number 88 on the decennial Sight and Sound critics' poll of the greatest films of all time.

Plot

First story
Taiwan-raised cop He Qiwu is dumped by his girlfriend named May on 1 April. To verify her earnestness in breaking up with him, Qiwu chooses to wait for a month. Every day he buys a tin of pineapples with an expiration date of 1 May, because May enjoyed pineapples and 1 May is his birthday. Meanwhile, a woman in a blonde wig tries to survive in the drug underworld after a smuggling operation goes sour.

On 1 May, Qiwu approaches the woman in the blonde wig at the Bottoms Up Club. However, she is exhausted and falls asleep in a hotel room, leaving him to watch old films and order food. He shines her shoes before he leaves her sleeping on the bed. She leaves in the morning and shoots the drug baron who set her up. Qiwu goes jogging and receives a message from her on his pager wishing him a happy birthday. He visits his usual snack food store where he collides with a new staff member, Faye.

Second story
Another police officer is also dealing with a breakup—with a flight attendant. Faye secretly falls for him. One day, the flight attendant visits the store and waits for the man. She learns he is on his day off and leaves a letter for him with the snack bar owner containing a set of keys to the officer's apartment.

Faye tells him of the letter, but he delays reading it and asks the snack bar to keep it for him. Faye uses the keys to repeatedly enter the man's apartment to clean and redecorate. Gradually, her ploys help him cheer up. He finds Faye coming to his apartment and realises that she likes him; he arranges a date at a restaurant named California. Faye does not arrive, and the snack bar owner, her cousin, goes to the restaurant to tell him that Faye has left for the US state of California. She leaves him a boarding pass drawn on a paper napkin dated one year later.

Faye, now a flight attendant, returns to Hong Kong. She finds that the man has bought the snack bar and is converting it into a restaurant. He asks her to stay for the grand opening, and asks her to send him a postcard if she leaves. As Faye is about to leave, he presents the boarding pass, wrinkled and water-stained, and she writes him a new one. She asks him where he wants the destination to be, to which he replies, "Wherever you will take me."

Theme
 "Chungking Express tells its story of love, loss, and memory through the romance of goods". In the first story, He Qiwu desires closer social contacts but can only depend on desperate phone calls to May's parents and cans of pineapples (May's favourite food) as substitutes for actual physical and emotional contact and intimacy. 
 "At our closest point, we were just 0.01 cm apart from each other." 0.01 cm is an urban space of possibilities—separation or connection, strangers or friends. This is a form of urban space that is of interest to Wong—that physical gap between busy passers-by in the city. 
 "In the first story, Wong suggests that the sharing of 0.01 cm in a busy city can produce an affect. In the second, the possibility of sustaining a relationship through the non-simultaneous sharing of space is posited."

Cast
 Brigitte Lin as woman in blonde wig
 Takeshi Kaneshiro as He Qiwu (Cantonese Hòh Ji-móuh), nicknamed Ah Wu (Cantonese Ah Mouh), Cop 223
 Faye Wong as Faye
 Tony Leung Chiu-Wai as Cop 663
 Valerie Chow as flight attendant who breaks up with Cop 663
 Chan Kam-Chuen as manager of the takeaway restaurant Midnight Express
 Thom Baker as double-crossing drug dealer
 Kwan Lee-na as Richard
 Wong Chi-Ming as man
 Leung Sun as the second May, who works at the Midnight Express
 Choh Chung-Sing as man

Production

Wong Kar-wai made Chungking Express during a two-month break from the editing of his wuxia film Ashes of Time. He said "While I had nothing to do, I decided to make Chungking Express following my instincts," and that "After the very heavy stuff, heavily emphasized in Ashes of Time, I wanted to make a very light, contemporary movie, but where the characters had the same problems." Originally, Wong envisioned the stories as similar but with contrasting settings: one in Hong Kong Island in daylight, and the other in Kowloon at night. He felt that "despite the difference, they are the same stories": one was about encountering love in the tight city, the other was about the keeping love without physical connection.

The screenplay was not finished by the time filming began; Wong finished it when filming paused over New Year. He wrote the second story in a single day. He developed a third story, about a love-sick hitman, but as he felt it would make Chungking Express overlong, he produced it as a separate film, Fallen Angels (1995).

Wong wanted to film in Tsim Sha Tsui, since he grew up in the area and felt a strong connection to it. He described it as "an area where the Chinese literally brush shoulders with westerners, and is uniquely Hong Kong." He was drawn to Chungking Mansion for its many lodgings, mix of cultures, and its significance as a crime hotspot; he felt that, as a "mass-populated and hyperactive place", it worked as a metaphor for Hong Kong itself.

The director once talked about his inspiration by the works of Haruki Murakami. As an example, the original title of the film is "重慶森林", while the Chinese title of Haruki Murakami's "Norwegian Wood" (1987) is "挪威的森林".

The second story was shot in Central, including Lan Kwai Fong, near a popular fast food shop called Midnight Express. "In this area, there are a lot of bars, a lot of foreign executives would hang out there after work," Wong remembers. The fast food shop is forever immortalized as the spot where Tony Leung and Faye Wong's characters met and became attracted to one another. Wong was also drawn to "the escalator from Central to the mid-levels. That interests me because no one has made a movie there. When we were scouting for locations we found the light there entirely appropriate." The apartment of Tony Leung's character was cinematographer Christopher Doyle's apartment at the time of filming.

Wong narrates the story in a fragmented structure and connects the fragments through monologues. By looking at the pictures created by Wong, the emotions and themes central to the story become clear.

Marketing
The film's marketing posters were designed by artist Stanley Wong, under his pseudonym "Another Mountain Man".

Soundtrack
The main recurring music for the first story is Dennis Brown's "Things in Life". The song "Baroque", composed by Michael Galasso, can be heard twice during the first part of the movie: during the opening and when Brigitte Lin's character takes the gun in the closer. This track does not appear on the soundtrack album, although three other tracks are similar to it: "Fornication in Space" (track 3), "Heartbreak" (track 8) and "Sweet Farewell" (track 9), played respectively on synth, guitar and piano.

The song "California Dreamin'" by The Mamas & the Papas plays in the key scenes in the second story, which also features Faye Wong's Cantonese cover version of "Dreams" by The Cranberries, which is also played over the end credits (titled "Mung Zung Yan", it is also included in her 1994 album Random Thoughts while her next album, Sky, includes a Mandarin cover).

"California Dreamin'" is played numerous times by Faye Wong's character, indicative of "the simultaneity of her aversion to and desire for change". "What a Diff'rence a Day Made", performed by Dinah Washington, is played during a scene between Tony Leung and Valerie Chow's characters, as well as during an encounter between Tony Leung and Faye Wong's characters later in the film.

The film's soundtrack is also widely credited with introducing Dream Pop to the Hong-Kongese market. Bands featured in the soundtrack, including The Cranberries and Cocteau Twins, saw significant commercial success in Hong Kong following the release of Chungking Express, and contemporary Canto-pop stars such as Candy Lo began adopting a more dream-pop sound, such as in Lo's 1998 EP Don’t Have to be… Too Perfect and subsequent album Miao....

Distribution
On 8 March 1996, the film began a limited theatrical run in North America through Quentin Tarantino's Rolling Thunder distribution company under Miramax. The Region 1 DVD was distributed by Rolling Thunder as Tarantino is an admirer of Wong Kar-wai.

Chungking Express was later released by The Criterion Collection on DVD and Blu-ray Disc in 2008, although both versions are now out of print. Criterion has since reclaimed the rights and the film is currently available on its streaming platform, the Criterion Channel (as of July 2022). In March 2021, the film was re-released in a new 4k-based version by Criterion as a part of their Blu-ray box set, The World of Wong Kar Wai.

Reception

Box office
Chungking Express earned HK$7,678,549 during its Hong Kong run. In the United States, opening on four screens, it grossed $32,779 ($8,194 per screen) in its opening weekend. Playing at 20 theatres at its widest point, it went on to gross $600,200 total.

Critical response and legacy
During its release in North America, Chungking Express drew generally positive, sometimes ecstatic reviews from critics. On review aggregator website Rotten Tomatoes, the film holds an approval rating of 88% based on 65 reviews, and an average rating of 7.80/10. The website's critical consensus reads, "Even if all it had to offer were writer-director Wong Kar-wai's thrillingly distinctive visuals, Chungking Express would be well worth watching; happily, its thoughtfully drawn characters and naturalistic performances also pack a potent dramatic wallop." On Metacritic, the film has a weighted average score of 78 out of 100 based on 18 critic reviews, indicating "generally favorable reviews".

Film critic Roger Ebert was measured in his praise (giving the film three out of four stars):

This is the kind of movie you'll relate to if you love film itself, rather than its surface aspects such as story and stars. It's not a movie for casual audiences, and it may not reveal all its secrets the first time through . . .

If you are attentive to the style, if you think about what Wong is doing, Chungking Express works. If you're trying to follow the plot, you may feel frustrated ... When Godard was hot, in the 1960s and early 1970s, there was an audience for this style, but in those days, there were still film societies and repertory theaters to build and nourish such audiences. Many of today's younger filmgoers, fed only by the narrow selections at video stores, are not as curious or knowledgeable and may simply be puzzled by Chungking Express instead of challenged. It needs to be said, in any event, that a film like this is largely a cerebral experience: You enjoy it because of what you know about film, not because of what it knows about life.

Rolling Stones Peter Travers praised the film as both "exasperating and exhilarating":

There is no mistaking Wong's talent. His hypnotic images of love and loss finally wear down your resistance as seemingly discordant sights and sounds coalesce into a radiant, crazy quilt that can make you laugh in awe at its technical wizardry in one scene and pierce your heart in the next.

Janet Maslin of The New York Times criticized the film's MTV-like "aggressive energy":

Mr. Wong has legitimate visual flair, but his characters spend an awful lot of time playing impish tricks. A film in which a man talks to his dishtowel has an overdeveloped sense of fun.

In a 2002 poll published by Sight and Sound (the monthly magazine of the British Film Institute) asking fifty leading UK film critics to choose the ten best films from the previous 25 years, Chungking Express was placed at number eight. In the magazine's 2012 poll to find the most acclaimed films of all time, Chungking Express ranked 144. The film was included in Times All-Time 100 best movies list in 2005. The film ranked 56th in BBC's 2018 list of The 100 greatest foreign language films voted by 209 film critics from 43 countries around the world.

Academy Award-winning director Barry Jenkins (Moonlight) is said to be influenced by this film.

Awards and nominations
1994 Stockholm International Film Festival
 Winner – Best Actress (Faye Wong)
Winner – FIPRESCI prize (Wong Kar-Wai)
Nomination – Bronze Horse: Best Film (Wong Kar-Wai)
1994 Golden Horse Awards
 Winner – Best Actor (Tony Leung Chiu-Wai)
 1995 Hong Kong Film Awards
 Winner – Best Picture
 Winner – Best Director (Wong Kar-wai)
 Winner – Best Actor (Tony Leung Chiu-Wai)
 Winner – Best Editing (William Cheung Suk-Ping, Kwong Chi-Leung, Hai Kit-Wai)
 Nomination – Best Actress (Faye Wong)
 Nomination – Best Supporting Actress (Valerie Chow Kar-Ling)
 Nomination – Best Screenplay (Wong Kar-wai)
 Nomination – Best Cinematography (Christopher Doyle, Andrew Lau Wai-Keung)
 Nomination – Best Art Direction (William Cheung Suk-Ping)
 Nomination – Best Original Film Score (Frankie Chan Fan-Kei, Roel A. Garcia)

See also
 Chinese Odyssey 2002, another film starring Tony Leung and Faye Wong, produced by Wong Kar-wai
 Cinema of Hong Kong
 Hong Kong in films

References

External links

 
 
 
Chungking Express: Electric Youth an essay by Amy Taubin at the Criterion Collection
 "Chungking Express: Walking with a Map of Desire in the Mirage of the Global City", Tsung-Yi Huang
 Pictures of some filming locations

1994 films
1994 comedy-drama films
1994 crime drama films
1994 romantic comedy films
1994 romantic drama films
1990s crime comedy-drama films
1990s Hindi-language films
1990s romantic comedy-drama films
Best Film HKFA
1990s Cantonese-language films
1990s English-language films
Fiction with unreliable narrators
Films about flight attendants
Films about police officers
Films directed by Wong Kar-wai
Films set in Hong Kong
Films shot in Hong Kong
Hong Kong New Wave films
Hong Kong crime comedy-drama films
Hong Kong romantic comedy-drama films
1990s Japanese-language films
1990s Mandarin-language films
Romantic crime films
1990s Hong Kong films
Postmodern films
Films set in 1994